The Bleu Horses is a set of 39 horse sculptures made primarily of steel and permanently installed on a hillside off Highway 287 just north of Three Forks, Montana. The name of the installation is taken from a color of horse known as a blue roan, though the live animal color is actually closer to gray. The horse sculptures were created and set up by artist Jim Dolan of Belgrade, Montana, who previously had created other complex outdoor sculptures over the past 30 years, including a herd of elk placed upon the lawn of a bank in Bozeman, and a fly fisherman sculpture in Ennis.  He also donated four of his sculptures at Montana State University (MSU), and installed a flock of geese in the terminal of Bozeman Yellowstone International Airport.

Background
Dolan spent 15 months and his own money to create, transport and install the horses as a gift to the people of Montana.  When he moved to Montana from California in 1966, he intended to live there permanently and be an asset to the state: "I always knew that someday I’d have a specific project ... I decided [in 2013], on my 64th birthday, this is what I would do." The horse sculptures were installed on Kamp Hill on land donated by Dean Folkvord of Wheat Montana on a patch of unfenced acreage that is not suitable for farming. Folkvord came up with the idea of using Kamp Hill when Dolan stopped into the Wheat Montana Bakery for coffee and expressed frustration to Folkvord about his difficulties finding an appropriate site for installing the horses he was creating.

Development and installation

The sculptures are realistic enough to appear live from a distance, but are intended to be somewhat "impressionistic." Dolan said, "They're symbols of horses and what horses mean to Montanans. But at first sight, I want people to believe they are real horses, just for a second." They are posed in a variety of realistic positions from foals suckling mother's milk, to alert steeds, to supine equines. According to Dolan, "I tried to place the horses the way I see the horses living in their natural environment according to their nature."

Twelve of the horses have their heads placed on ball bearings so they are able to move and one can move its head and neck.  Each horse is painted blue with accents of black and white to give their forms a sense of depth.  They have manes and tails made of polyester rope that has been unraveled and attached so it moves realistically in the wind. The 4,000 feet of rope needed for the horses was unraveled by hand by the employees at Reach, Inc., a supported workplace for people with developmental disabilities. Dolan said, "They really enjoyed doing it, and when I told them what the ropes were for, they felt like they were involved in something bigger than just the job. So those people, they’re part of this, too.”  The horses were permanently placed on the land by having long stakes welded to their hooves and placed into holes created with a jackhammer. A tractor was used to place each sculpture in its precise location.

In December 2013, three of the sculptures were stolen off the hill but recovered near Townsend a day later.  People driving along U.S. 287 can take a dirt road that goes around the back of the herd to view them at closer range. To view the horses from the highway, cars can pull over to the shoulder of the road at the bottom of the hill, and it is possible to walk along the highway to a vantage point at a former pulloff midway up the hill that is now closed to parking.

See also
Grandfather Cuts Loose the Ponies

References

2013 sculptures
Equestrian statues in the United States
Horses in art
Outdoor sculptures in Montana
Buildings and structures in Gallatin County, Montana
2013 establishments in Montana